Colton is a city in San Bernardino County, California, United States. The population of Colton is 52,154 according to the 2010 census, up from 47,662 at the 2000 census.

Colton is the site of Colton Crossing, which was one of the busiest at-grade railroad crossings in the United States. The crossing was installed in 1882 by the California Southern Railroad to cross the Southern Pacific Railroad tracks while building northward from San Diego. As a result of railroad acquisitions and mergers, this became the point at which the Burlington Northern Santa Fe's "Southern Transcontinental Route" crossed the Union Pacific's "Sunset Route". As traffic on each line began to soar in the mid-1990s, fueled largely by the vast increase in imports passing through the ports of Los Angeles and Long Beach, the primitive crossing became a serious bottleneck. On August 28, 2013, the at-grade crossing was officially replaced by a fly-over that raises the east–west UP tracks over the north–south BNSF tracks.

Geography
Colton is located at  (34.064945, -117.321687).

Slover Mountain, once the highest point in San Bernardino Valley and the site of the Colton Liberty Flag, is located in the city.

Climate
According to the Köppen Climate Classification system, Colton has a warm-summer Mediterranean climate, abbreviated "Csa" on climate maps.

Demographics

2010
At the 2010 census Colton had a population of 52,154. The racial makeup of Colton was 22,613 (43.4%) White (13.0% Non-Hispanic White), 5,055 (9.7%) African American, 661 (1.3%) Native American, 2,590 (5.0%) Asian, 176 (0.3%) Pacific Islander, 18,413 (35.3%) from other races, and 2,646 (5.1%) from two or more races. Hispanic or Latino of any race were 37,039 persons (71.0%).

The census reported that 51,824 people (99.4% of the population) lived in households, 85 (0.2%) lived in non-institutionalized group quarters, and 245 (0.5%) were institutionalized.

There were 14,971 households, 7,826 (52.3%) had children under the age of 18 living in them, 7,167 (47.9%) were opposite-sex married couples living together, 3,233 (21.6%) had a female householder with no husband present, 1,340 (9.0%) had a male householder with no wife present.  There were 1,268 (8.5%) unmarried opposite-sex partnerships, and 106 (0.7%) same-sex married couples or partnerships. 2,452 households (16.4%) were one person and 614 (4.1%) had someone living alone who was 65 or older. The average household size was 3.46.  There were 11,740 families (78.4% of households); the average family size was 3.86.

The age distribution was 16,671 people (32.0%) under the age of 18, 6,360 people (12.2%) aged 18 to 24, 14,965 people (28.7%) aged 25 to 44, 10,495 people (20.1%) aged 45 to 64, and 3,663 people (7.0%) who were 65 or older. The median age was 28.4 years. For every 100 females, there were 96.0 males. For every 100 females age 18 and over, there were 92.6 males.

There were 16,350 housing units at an average density of 1,019.4 per square mile, of the occupied units 7,766 (51.9%) were owner-occupied and 7,205 (48.1%) were rented. The homeowner vacancy rate was 2.6%; the rental vacancy rate was 9.2%.  28,063 people (53.8% of the population) lived in owner-occupied housing units and 23,761 people (45.6%) lived in rental housing units.

According to the 2010 United States Census, Colton had a median household income of $41,496, with 22.5% of the population living below the federal poverty line.

2000
At the 2000 census there were 47,690 people in 14,520 households, including 10,904 families, in the city. The population density was 3,154.3 inhabitants per square mile (1,217.9/km). The racial makeup of the city was 42.7% White, 11.0% African American, 1.3% Native American, 5.3% Asian, 0.2% Pacific Islander, 34.5% from other races, and 5.1% from two or more races. Hispanic or Latino of any race were 60.7%.

Of the 14,520 households 46.5% had children under the age of 18 living with them, 48.3% were married couples living together, 19.5% had a female householder with no husband present, and 24.9% were non-families. 19.4% of households were one person and 4.6% were one person aged 65 or older. The average household size was 3.3 and the average family size was 3.8.

The age distribution was 34.9% under the age of 18, 11.9% from 18 to 24, 31.5% from 25 to 44, 15.2% from 45 to 64, and 6.4% 65 or older. The median age was 27 years. For every 100 females, there were 97.2 males. For every 100 females age 18 and over, there were 93.8 males.

The median household income was $35,777 and the median family income  was $37,911. Males had a median income of $32,152 versus $25,118 for females. The per capita income for the city was $13,460. About 18.2% of families and 19.6% of the population were below the poverty line, including 25.2% of those under age 18 and 10.9% of those age 65 or over.

Government 

History 

Colton was founded in 1875 and incorporated in 1887.

Indigenous peoples
Before Spanish settlement, the area was inhabited by the Serrano, Guachama, and San Gorgonio Indians.

Spanish and Mexican settlement

During the Mission Era the Mission San Gabriel established a Spanish settlement Politana in 1810, just northeast of what is now Colton. By 1840, Colton was part of two private ranchos, Jurupa and San Bernardino Rancho.  From southwest area of modern-day Colton was known as "Agua Mansa" (Gentle Waters). It had been settled by New Mexico pioneers in 1842.  What is currently known as Cooley Ranch was known as Indian Knolls for nearly 100 years. This is because the Indians living in what is now the San Bernardino Valley found refuge on the knolls of the property during the flood of 1862.

American settlement
The original owner of the property was George Cooley of Kent, England who had moved to Colton in 1853 and who purchased 200 acres at $3.50 an acre along the Santa Ana River the next year. Cooley was chairman of the San Bernardino County Board of Supervisors in San Bernardino County. By 1873, the property had mushroomed into a 400-acre property.  Eventually, when property taxes had increased, the property was sold to Villelli Enterprises of La Habra.  The city was named after David Douty Colton, who had been a brigadier general of the California State Militia in 1855, prior to the Civil War.  He was later the vice president of the Southern Pacific Railroad Company.

Colton was created in its modern form when the Southern Pacific Railway was built heading east from Los Angeles in 1875.

Virgil Earp lived in Colton at 528 West “H” Street where he was the town's first marshal. He resided in Colton from 1883 to 1889. Morgan Earp is buried at Hermosa Cemetery.

1950s–present
In 1953, a significant portion of the historic downtown of Colton was bulldozed to make room for the Ramona Freeway, which would later be named the San Bernardino Freeway. This included the block on the west side of Eighth Street north of J, including the then 70-year-old Helman's Department Store building, originally housing the First National Bank of Colton, on the corner and the Willet's Department Store building to its north. Both stores moved to locations further north on Eighth.

Economy

According to the city's 2021 Comprehensive Annual Financial Report, the top employers in the city are:

Notable people

 40 Glocc (born 1974) – rapper
 Tyler Ankrum (born 2001) – NASCAR K&N Pro Series East driver
 Allen Bradford NFL Football player
 Cam Carreon (1937–1987) – baseball player
 Kit Carson (1912–1983) – baseball player
 George Caster (1907–1955) – baseball player
 Dennis Crane – football player, Detroit Lions
 Jay Dahl (1945–1965) – baseball player
 Rich Dauer – baseball player, World Series champion
 Nicholas Porter Earp (1813–1907) – father of Wyatt Earp
 Wyatt Earp (1848–1929) – frontier lawman
 Virgil Earp (1843–1905) – frontier lawman, older brother of Wyatt Earp; 1st city marshal of Colton
 Gene Evans (1922–1998) – actor
 Jada Hart, tennis player 
 Rodolfo Hernandez (born 1931) – Medal of Honor recipient, Korean War
 Kat Von D aka Kathrine Drachenburg (born 1982) – tattoo artist, star of LA Ink
 Ken Hubbs (1941–1964) – Chicago Cubs infielder, 1962 Rookie of the Year
 Jim Messina (born 1947) – musician (Buffalo Springfield, Loggins & Messina)
 George T. Sakato – Medal of Honor recipient, World War II 
 Jeremy Suarez (born 1990) – actor, The Bernie Mac Show
 Jimmy Webb (born 1946) – songwriter
 Susan Woodstra (born 1957) – silver medalist, 1984 Summer Olympics, women's volleyball
 Shareece Wright NFL Football player
 Jimmy Smith NFL Football Player

References

Further reading
 History of the Colton Fire Department 1889–2011 (2012), Dennis Bickers (retired Colton Fire)
 Images of America, Colton (2004), Larry Sheffield

External links
 
 History of Colton at the city of San Bernardino website

 
Cities in San Bernardino County, California
Populated places on the Santa Ana River
Incorporated cities and towns in California
Populated places established in 1887
1887 establishments in California